, better known as , is a Japanese professional wrestler who owns and wrestles for the Saitama Pro Wrestling Company (SPWC).

Career
Survival Tobita started as a jobber for Pro Wrestling Crusaders (PWC). Since its collapse, he has wrestled for various companies in Japan and Mexico including Michinoku Pro Wrestling, Onita Pro, Frontier Martial-Arts Wrestling (FMW), Dramatic Dream Team (DDT), and Consejo Mundial de Lucha Libre (CMLL). He is also the owner of the Saitama Pro Wrestling Company (SPWC). Survival Tobita's most known matches in SPWC are hardcore matches, usually on mats, against various monsters from around the universe (usually portrayed by Naoshi Sano). Tobita often sits down after his match and cuts long promos while the fans leave their seats and exit the building.

Tobita's most famous matches were against Mokujin Ken, also known as Ken The Box. Ken was a tree-like figure based on the character Mokujin from the Tekken video game series. Owing to Ken's super human strengths, all of their bouts were basically squashes with Ken easily winning in minutes via knockout.

Championships and accomplishments
Dramatic Dream Team
Ironman Heavymetalweight Championship (3 times) – as Jigoku Soldier

References

External links
Anime Hell: Survival Tobita Bio
Survival Tobita Matchlist 

1970 births
Japanese male professional wrestlers
Living people
20th-century professional wrestlers
21st-century professional wrestlers
Ironman Heavymetalweight Champions